Middelfart Municipality is a municipality (Danish, kommune) in Region of Southern Denmark, located on the west coast of the island of Funen in southern Denmark. The municipality covers an area of 297 km² and has a total population of 39,603 (2022). Its mayor is Johannes Lundsfryd Jensen, a member of the Social Democrats (Socialdemokraterne) political party. The main town and the site of its municipal council is the town of Middelfart.

The Snævringen ("The Narrowing"), is the strait that separates the island of Funen from the Jutland mainland in this area, where the two lie very close to each other, often less than 1.5 km apart. Snævringen is an extension of the Kattegat, and begins near the cities of Fredericia and Middelfart. To the south of the municipality is Fænø Strait (Fænø Sund), which separates Funen from the municipality's island of Fænø.

On 1 January 2007 Middelfart municipality was, as the result of The Municipal Reform, merged with Ejby and Nørre Aaby municipalities to form an enlarged Middelfart municipality.

The municipality is part of Triangle Region and of the East Jutland metropolitan area, which had a total population of 1.378 million in 2016.

Locations

Economy
Companies headquartered in the municipality include United Shipping & Trading Company.

Politics
Middelfart's municipal council consists of 25 members, elected every four years. The municipal council has seven political committees.

Municipal council
Below are the municipal councils elected since the Municipal Reform of 2007.

References

Sources 
 Municipal statistics: NetBorger Kommunefakta, delivered from KMD aka Kommunedata (Municipal Data)
 Municipal mergers and neighbors: Eniro new municipalities map

External links 

  

 
Municipalities of the Region of Southern Denmark
Municipalities of Denmark
Populated places established in 2007